For the town in the state of Chhattisgarh, see Dalli Rajhara
Rajhara  is a town in Palamu district in the Indian state of Jharkhand. It is located 3 km away from its taluka (Padwa block) headquarter and 18 km from its district headquarter Medininagar. This place is famous because of National Highway 139 (India).
situated on the bank of the River called Labji.

Geography

Transport

Economy
The projects of the Rajhara Area of Central Coalfields are: Rajhara opencast project, Tetariakhar opencast project.

References

Cities and towns in Palamu district